The Royal Engineers Association Football Club is an association football team representing the Corps of Royal Engineers, the 'Sappers', of the British Army and based in Chatham, Kent. In the 1870s, it was one of the strongest sides in English football, winning the FA Cup in 1875 and being Cup finalists in three of the first four seasons. The Engineers were pioneers of the combination game, where teammates passed the ball to each other rather than kicking ahead and charging after the ball. With the rise of professional teams, in 1888 the Engineers joined a newly formed Army Football Association.

History

The club was founded in 1863, under the leadership of Major Francis Marindin. Sir Frederick Wall, who was the secretary of The Football Association 1895–1934, stated in his memoirs that the "combination game" was first used by the Royal Engineers A.F.C. in the early 1870s.  Wall states that the "Sappers moved in unison" and showed the "advantages of combination over the old style of individualism".

Contemporary match reports confirm that passing was a regular feature of the Engineers' style. An 1869 report says they "worked well together" and "had learned the secret of football success – backing up"; whereas their defeated opponents had "a painful want of cooperation".  In February 1871 against Crystal Palace it is noted that "Lieut. Mitchell made a fine run down the left, passing the ball to Lieut. Rich, who had run up the centre, and who pinched another [goal]" 

By early 1868, a contemporary match report states "For the R.E.s Lieuts Campbell, Johnson and Chambers attracted especial attention by their clever play"

Another contemporary match report clearly shows that by 1870, ball passing was a feature of the Engineers style: "Lieut. Creswell, who having brought it up the side then kicked it into the middle to another of his side, who kicked it through the posts the minute before time was called"

The Engineers used their team playing style with effect against the Wanderers, a side considered as early as 1870 to be  the MCC of football. In a match of March 1871 against Wanderers their victory was due to "irreproachable organisation" and in particular that both their attacks and their backing up were both "so well organised" In November 1871 similar passing tactics are described in a contemporary account of a game against the Wanderers in which two goals were scored through tactical passing: "Betts, however, soon seized his opportunity, and by a brilliant run down the left wing turned the ball judiciously to Currie, who as judiciously sent it flying through the strangers' goal in first rate style" Later in the match it is reported that "Lieut G Barker, turning the ball to Lieut Renny-Tailyour who planted it between the posts" "Turning" the ball clearly points to the short pass.

There is evidence that opponents sometimes adjusted their playing style to counteract the organisation and passing of the Engineers. For example, in February 1872 against Westminster School, a brief contemporary match report states that:  "The school captain took the precaution of strengthening his backs, deputizing HDS Vidal to cooperate with Rawson and Jackson and so well did these three play in concert... they succeeded in defying the... RE forwards". What is most notable about this report is that it confirms that the Royal Engineers "played beautifully together" That the engineers were the first side to break the trend of dribbling is shown in a contemporary account of their victory against Crystal Palace in early 1872.  This said that: "very little dribbling was displayed" 

The Engineers played in the first-ever FA Cup Final, losing 1–0 at Kennington Oval on 16 March 1872, to regular rivals Wanderers. They also lost the 1874 Final, to Oxford University A.F.C.

The Royal Engineers were the first football team to go on a tour, to Nottingham, Derby and Sheffield in 1873.  Wall's memoirs state that this tour introduced the combination game to Sheffield and Nottingham. In 1875 the Engineers won the FA Cup, considered their greatest triumph. In the final against Old Etonians, they drew 1–1 with a goal from Renny-Tailyour and went on to win the replay 2–0 with two further goals from Renny-Tailyour.

The winning side was:
 Capt. W. Merriman; Lt. G.H. Sim; Lt. G.C. Onslow; Lt. R.M. Ruck; Lt. P.G. von Donop; Lt. C.K. Wood; Lt. H.E. Rawson; Lt. W.F.H. Stafford; Lt. H. W. Renny-Tailyour; Lt. A. Mein; and Lt. C. Wingfield-Stratford.

Their last FA Cup Final appearance came in 1878, again losing to the Wanderers. They last participated in 1882–83 FA Cup, losing 6–2 in the fourth round to Old Carthusians F.C.

Summary of the Royal Engineers early playing style
The evidence above contains detailed descriptions of passing that are lacking in reports of the 1872 Glasgow international.  For example, in a lengthy account the Scotsman newspaper makes no mention of passing or combination by the Scottish team and specifically describes the Scottish attacks in terms of dribbling: "The Scotch now came away with a great rush, Leckie and others dribbling the ball so smartly that the English lines were closely besieged and the ball was soon behind" and "Weir now had a splendid run for Scotland into the heart of his opponents' territory". Although the Scottish team are acknowledged to have worked better together during the first half, this contemporary account acknowledges that in the second half England played similarly: "During the first half of the game the English team did not work so well together, but in the second half they left nothing to be desired in this respect."  The Scotsman concludes that the difference in styles in the first half is the advantage the Queens' Park players had "through knowing each others' play" as all came from the same club.  Unlike the 1872 Glasgow international, the contemporary evidence above shows that the Engineers' team playing style benefited their team play by winning games. Similarly, the 5 March 1872 match between Wanderers and Queens Park contains no evidence of ball passing.

The early accounts all confirm that the Engineers were the first club to play a passing game of cooperation and organisation with both their forwards and their defence. Although they could also play rough – as would be expected for an army team – The Engineers are the first side to be considered to play the football "beautifully".  All of these developments occurred before and independent of the 1872 match between England and Scotland.

Ireland
It was not only in England that the Engineers helped pioneer association football. While stationed in Ireland during the early 1900s the Royal Engineers, together with other British Army regimental teams organised and competed in local competitions. In 1902–03 
the Engineers won the Munster Senior Cup. The regiment also entered teams in the Munster Senior League.

Later years
Professionalism arrived in Northern England in the 1880s, with the Football League starting in 1888.  In the early years, the Engineers was one of several amateur teams who could defeat the professionals in challenge matches.

The Army Football Association was formed in 1888.  Its teams were organised by battalion, and later by regiment.

The Engineers' Depot Battalion won the FA Amateur Cup in 1908.

On 7 November 2012, the Royal Engineers played against the Wanderers in a rematch of the 1872 FA Cup Final at The Oval. Unlike the actual final, the Engineers won, and by a large margin, 7–1 being the final score.

Ladies team

In 2014, Keith Stubbs founded the REAFC Ladies squad which runs in line with the male squad.

Veterans

REAFC have a serving veterans team that play in exhibition type games.  Recently the "Vets" have played games against the House of parliament and invited to some prestigious events.

Honours
FA Cup
Winners: 1875
Runners-up: 1872, 1874, 1878
FA Amateur Cup
Winners: 1908
Munster Senior Cup
Winners: 1902–03

Army FA Challenge Cup
Various regiments and battalions within the RE Corps have won the Army FA Challenge Cup:
Service Bn Won 1903; Runners-up 1904, 1905
Depot Bn Won 1907
Training Bn Won 1937
Barton Stacey Won 1947
4th Training Bn Won 1950, 1957, 1958
4th Divisional Engineers Won 1969
32nd Engineer Regiment Won 1970; Runner-up 1971
Training Regiments Won 1980; Runner-up 1991, 1993
28 [Amphibious] Engineer Regiment Won 1981, 1990, 1991, 1992, 1993, 1994, 1996, 2000, 2001, 2002; Runner-up 1983, 1988
40 Army Engineer Support Group Runner-up 1985

International players

England
The following six Royal Engineers players played for England. The number of caps gained while playing for club is in brackets.

Horace Barnet (1 cap)
Alfred Goodwyn (1 cap)
Herbert Rawson (1 cap)
Bruce Russell (1 cap)
Pelham von Donop (2 caps)
Cecil Wingfield-Stratford (1 cap)

Scotland
The following played for Scotland.

John Edward Blackburn (1 cap)
Henry Renny-Tailyour (1 cap)

References

External links

Royal Engineers website
Royal Engineers Museum When the Sappers won the FA Cup (1875)

Association football clubs established in 1875
Football clubs in England
FA Cup winners
Association football in the British Army
1875 establishments in England
Royal Engineers
Former Munster Senior League (association football) clubs
Engineers